Freddie Brown Lane Jr.  (September 6, 1975 – July 6, 2000) was an American football running back who played professionally in the National Football League for the Carolina Panthers.

Early life
Lane was born and raised in Franklin, Tennessee. His father, Fred Lane Sr., was a star at the old Natchez High School, which later desegregated with Franklin High. Attending Franklin Junior High School, it was noticed that Lane possessed uncommon speed and agility for such a young player. Lane attended  Franklin High School, amassing over 1,000 yards his senior year, while averaging 7.5 yards per carry.  His number, 28, is retired by the school. He had three daughters: Régine Lane, Pilarr Lane, and Sable Lane.

College career
Lane attended Lane College in Jackson, Tennessee. He finished his career with 3,612 rushing yards, establishing himself as the school's all-time leading rusher.  As of 2012, Lane still held the school records for rushing yards in a career, season (1,853 in 1995) and game (305 versus Miles College), as well as rushing attempts and per carry average. As a junior in 1995, Lane finished the season on the Harlon Hill Trophy watchlist, the NCAA Division II Player of the Year award. In the same year, Lane was named to the Heritage Radio HBCU All American team, as well as several other media services' All American teams. Lane's college number, #6, was retired by Lane College.

Professional career
Lane was signed as an undrafted free agent by the Panthers before the 1997 NFL season. He had a remarkable rookie season, setting several franchise records, many of which still stand (see below). Though he started only about half his games, he led Carolina in rushing attempts, yards, and touchdowns in 1997 and 1998, before the balance of touches tipped towards Tim Biakabutuka in 1999. During his three years with the Panthers, he accumulated 2,001 rushing yards (the most in franchise history at the time) and 13 touchdowns.

After three years, Lane was traded to the Indianapolis Colts shortly before his death on July 6, 2000.

NFL career statistics

Franchise records
 off-season, Lane still held several Panthers records, including:
 Rush attempts, rookie game (34, 1997-12-08 @DAL)
 Rush yards, rookie game (147, 1997-11-02 OAK)
 Rushing touchdowns, rookie game (3, 1997-11-02 OAK; with Cam Newton)
 Total touchdowns, rookie game (3, 1997-11-02 OAK; with Cam Newton)
 Rushing yards per game, rookie season (62.2)
 100+ yard rushing games, rookie season (4)
 Games with 3+ TDs, rookie season (1; with Cam Newton)

Death
On July 6, 2000, Fred's wife, Deidra Lane, shot and killed him as he entered their home. His keys were still in the lock and he had been shot twice with a 12-gauge shotgun - once in the chest and a second time in the back of the head, apparently at point-blank range. Deidra Lane pleaded guilty to voluntary manslaughter in 2003.

Prosecutors at her sentencing described Deidra Lane as an abusive woman who killed her husband for life insurance. Defense attorneys called her a battered wife who killed in self-defense. A judge sentenced her to seven years and 11 months, ruling her actions were premeditated and deliberate, that she acted with malice and shot him a second time after he had already been rendered helpless.

Deidra Lane received credit for jail time served waiting on a federal charge of conspiracy to commit bank larceny. She pleaded guilty and served four months for that charge. Lane was released on March 3, 2009.

References

1975 births
2000 deaths
American football running backs
Carolina Panthers players
Lane Dragons football players
Male murder victims
Mariticides
People from Franklin, Tennessee
Players of American football from Tennessee
People murdered in North Carolina
Deaths by firearm in North Carolina
African-American players of American football
20th-century African-American sportspeople
Murdered African-American people